Antonio Monte London (born April 14, 1971), nicknamed "Stick", is a former professional American football player in the National Football League (NFL). He played professionally for the Detroit Lions and Green Bay Packers.

Biography
London was born in Tullahoma, Tennessee. He lettered in basketball, baseball, football and track at Tullahoma High School. He was an outstanding linebacker who earned a national championship ring while playing college football with the University of Alabama in 1992.

He was drafted by the Detroit Lions in the 3rd round (62nd overall) of the 1993 NFL Draft. He played linebacker for six seasons for the Detroit Lions and Green Bay Packers of the National Football League.

After retiring from the NFL, London move to Pelham, Alabama and opened a facilities management company. He coaches high school football at Pelham High School in Pelham and hosts free football camps.

References

External links
 databaseFootball.com
 Pro-Football-Reference.Com

1971 births
Living people
People from Tullahoma, Tennessee
Players of American football from Tennessee
American football linebackers
Alabama Crimson Tide football players
Detroit Lions players
Green Bay Packers players
People from Pelham, Alabama